The Teleférico de Monserrate is a tourist cable car that connects Bogotá with the Monserrate hill.

History 

The cable car to Monserrate was built to provide service to the increasing number of parishioners who ascended to the Basilica del Señor de Monserrate in the years 1950, when the only means of ascent was the funicular train, or pulled train.

Designed by the Swiss Von Roll company, its construction began in 1953 and it was commissioned on September 27, 1955. When it was finished, the total cost of the work amounted to one million pesos. At that time a peso bought a dollar.

The equipment used today to manage the system is in perfect condition, and has also been updated and modernized. The action boards, monitoring and security systems are fully computerized, which makes it one of the most modern systems in the world.

Over the years the cable car has changed in color and appearance. At first it was white, then it was painted yellow, then red and green, later red, now it is orange.

Current system 
The cable car takes four minutes to travel the 820 meters between the station of the ring road with Calle 26 up to 3,152 meters, at the station on the hill.

Each car can comfortably accommodate 35 people, who pay approximately $US 6.50 for the ride up and down, from Monday to Friday, at night the rate is higher and goes to $US 6.80.

Since it began service, an accident that has occurred has been that of last December 24, 2018, which shows that it is a safe means of transport. The supporting cables on which the car is supported are changed every 70 years and those that pull the cars are changed every 35 years.

Although it does not use advertising, this system is profitable. The most congested days are Good Fridays, when some 3,500 people move. That is to say that they make 10 to 12 trips. The cable car operates from Monday to Saturday from 12 noon to 12 midnight and Sundays and holidays from 5:30 in the morning to 6 in the afternoon.

The advantage of the cable car over the funicular is to provide a panoramic view of the city of Bogotá. The funicular, on the other hand, operates from Monday to Saturday from 7:40 a.m. to 11:40 a.m. and on Sundays and holidays from 5:30 a.m. to 6 p.m.

THE CABLE CAR CHANGES ITS IMAGE
After 60 years of service, the cable car to Monserrate continues to retain its classic style but changes its image to start a new stage, with the purpose of making your visit more pleasant, making each trip its passengers have a pleasant experience, for For this reason, one of its main attributes is a better panoramic view.
Among other qualities that can be appreciated from the new design are:
1. Interior lighting and ambient sound.
2. Fresher, modern, spacious, light and friendly image.
3. Thematic adaptation for seasons.
4. Its orange and green colors connect visitors with nature, making orange a symbol of the beautiful sunsets that can be seen from the top of the mountain, enveloping the visitor in the green of the thick vegetation that surrounds the eastern hills creating a memory in the mind of those who visit the hill.
Opening date November 28, 2015

See also 
 List of aerial tramways

References

External links
 Cerro de Monserrate

Aerial tramways in Colombia
Transport in Bogotá
Transport infrastructure completed in 1955
1955 establishments in Colombia